Italy dominated boxing at the 1960 Summer Olympics, winning three gold medals and seven medals overall. Two of the gold medalists would later become Hall of Fame world champions in professional boxing: American Cassius Clay (later known as Muhammad Ali) and Italian Nino Benvenuti.

Medalists

Medal table

References

External links
 Official Olympic Report

 
1960 Summer Olympics events
1960
1960 in boxing